The year 1984 was the 13th year after the independence of Bangladesh. It was also the third year of the Government of Hussain Muhammad Ershad.

Incumbents

 President: Hussain Muhammad Ershad
 Prime Minister: Ataur Rahman Khan (starting 30 March)
 Chief Justice: F.K.M. Munim

Demography

Climate

 Flood – Widespread heavy rains, during two weeks of 6–19 May, caused severe flooding in eastern part of the country.

Economy

Note: For the year 1984 average official exchange rate for BDT was 25.35 per US$.

Events
 29 February – Shaheed Tajul Islam, a shifting worker at the Adamjee Jute Mills who served as the leader of the leader of the Adamjee Majdur (worker) Trade Union, was fatally injured by the armed cadres loyal to the autocratic regime of Hussain Muhammad Ershad.
 5 August – a Biman Bangladesh Airlines flight from Chittagong crashed in the swamps near Zia International Airport. All 45 passengers and 4 crew of the Fokker F27 died, making it the worst aviation disaster of Bangladesh. The flight was piloted by Kaniz Fatema Roksana, the first woman commercial pilot of Bangladesh.
 Deposit Insurance was first introduced in August 1984 as a scheme in terms of The Bank Deposit Insurance Ordinance, 1984
 Sheikh Zayed Bin Sultan Al-Nahiyan of the United Arab Emirates (UAE) visited Bangladesh and offered to help orphans.

Awards and Recognitions

International Recognition

 Muhammad Yunus, the founder of Grameen Bank, was awarded Ramon Magsaysay Award.

Independence Day Award

Ekushey Padak
 Anisuzzaman (education)
 Habibur Rahman (education)
 Syed Waliullah (literature)
 Hasan Hafizur Rahman (literature)
 Syed Shamsul Huq (literature)
 Rashid Karim (literature)
 Sikandar Abu Zafar (journalism)
 Mir Qasim Khan (music)
 Sabina Yasmin (music)
 Qayyum Chowdhury (fine arts)

Sports
 Olympics:
 Bangladesh sent a delegation to compete in the Olympic Games for the first time at the 1984 Summer Olympics in Los Angeles, United States from 28 July to 12 August 1984. Bangladesh did not win any medals in the competition.
 South Asian (Federation) Games:
 Bangladesh participated in the first ever South Asian Games held in Kathmandu 17–23 September. Bangladesh won 2 golds (in Men's Triple Jump and Men's 4 x 100 Metres Relay), 8 silvers and 13 bronzes to finish the tournament at the fifth position in overall points table.
 Domestic football:
 Abahani KC won Dhaka League title while Mohammedan SC came out runner-up.
 Bangladesh Federation Cup final match between Mohammedan SC and Abahani KC was abandoned due to crowd riot.
 Cricket:
 The First South-East Asian Cricket Tournament was held in Dhaka in January. Two teams from the host country were joined by teams from Singapore and Hong Kong. The Bangladesh national team won the trophy, and thus qualified for the 1986 Asia Cup in Sri Lanka.
 Bangladesh team toured Kenya in February. Bangladesh drew the only 3-Day fixture, won a 2-day (over restricted) match, but won only 1 of the 5 limited over matches.

Births
 1 January – Alok Kapali, cricketer
 9 June – Nipun Akter, actor
 3 July – Syed Rasel, cricketer
 7 July – Mohammad Ashraful, cricketer

Deaths
 16 February – M. A. G. Osmani, the commander-in-chief of the Bangladesh Forces during the 1971 Bangladesh War of Independence (b. 1918)
 10 March – Dino Shafeek, actor (b. 1930)
 9 August – Khwaja Hassan Askari, Nawab of Dhaka (b. 1921)
 19 December – Abdul Quadir, author (b. 1906)

See also 
 1980s in Bangladesh
 Timeline of Bangladeshi history

References